Universities in Bangladesh are mainly categorized into three differential types: public (government owned and subsidized), private (private sector owned universities), and international (operated and funded by international organizations such as the Organisation of Islamic Cooperation). Bangladeshi universities are affiliated with the University Grants Commission, a commission created according to the Presidential Order (P.O. No 10 of 1973) of the government of the People's Republic of Bangladesh.

Most universities focus on general studies, mixing together such areas of study as business, engineering and technology. Twenty-two universities have specialized curricula. Two of these are focused on Islamic studies, four on health science, six on agricultural science, six on engineering, one on textile engineering, one on Veterinary medicine, one on Aeronautical science, one on ocean science and one on women's studies.

Public universities

Bangladesh has 53 public universities  to the bulk of higher studies students. These universities are funded by the government while managed as self-governed organizations.

Dhaka division is home to 14 public universities, among which 9 are in Dhaka City. There are 9 public universities in Chittagong division, Each of Khulna division , Rajshahi division has five, Each of Mymensingh Division , Rangpur Division & Sylhet division has four. And  Barisal division has two. As of 2022 the University Grants Commission of Bangladesh has introduce the cluster system for students enrollment. According to this system all public universities in Bangladesh should be sorted in five clusters i.e.
one for agricultural universities; one for science and technology universities, one for engineering universities, one for medical universities and the last one for general studies universities.

General Universities

Medical universities

Science and Technology universities

Agricultural universities

Engineering  universities

Specialized Public Engineering Colleges

Other Diverse Specialized universities

Off-campus universities
The following are the public universities that operate through a number of colleges all over Bangladesh instead of a localized campus.

Private universities

General Universities

Science and Technology universities

Specialized universities

International universities 
There are only three international universities in Bangladesh according to UGC. They are neither managed nor funded by the government, like public universities, nor established under the Private University Act and managed by a private governing body, like private universities. International Culture University, established by civil society organization and branded by United Nations Academic Impact (UNAI) and United Nations Global Compact (UNGC), is an internationally accredited-affiliated and an active partner of different international organizations working for internationalization of education and international quality. Islamic University of Technology was established by the Organisation of Islamic Cooperation and is located in Gazipur, Dhaka division, another is located in Chittagong division and funded by the Asian University for Women Support Foundation (AUWSF), a United States–based non-profit corporation. later one is South Asian University.

Proposed universities
In 2016 Prime Minister Sheikh Hasina announced bringing out Higher Educations reforms to establish at least one university or sub-campus at district level across the country for promotion of higher education.

{|class="wikitable sortable"
|+List of proposed new universities.
!University
!class="unsortable"|Acronym
!Location
!Division
!Specialization
!Reference
|-
|Sheikh Hasina Agricultural University
| style="text-align:center;" |SHAU
| style="text-align:center;" |Shariatpur
| style="text-align:center;" |Dhaka division
| style="text-align:center;" |Agricultural Science
| style="text-align:center;" |
|-
|Dr. M A Wazed Miah Agricultural University
| style="text-align:center;"|WMAU
| style="text-align:center;"|Natore
| style="text-align:center;"|Rajshahi division
| style="text-align:center;"|Agricultural Science
| style="text-align:center;" |
|-
|Bangabandhu Public University
| style="text-align:center;"|BPU
| style="text-align:center;"|Naogaon
| style="text-align:center;"|Rajshahi division
| style="text-align:center;"|General
| style="text-align:center;" |
|-
|Mymensingh Engineering College (MEC) to Mymensingh University of Engineering & Technology (MUET) 
| style="text-align:center;"|MUET
| style="text-align:center;"|Mymensingh 
| style="text-align:center;"|Mymensingh  division
| style="text-align:center;"|Engineering
| style="text-align:center;" |
|-
|-
|Mymensingh Medical University
| style="text-align:center;"|MMU
| style="text-align:center;"|Mymensingh
| style="text-align:center;"|Mymensingh division
| style="text-align:center;"|Medical
| style="text-align:center;" |
|-
|-
|Thakurgaon University
| style="text-align:center;"|ThU
| style="text-align:center;"|Thakurgaon
| style="text-align:center;"|Rangpur division
| style="text-align:center;"|General
| style="text-align:center;" |
|-
|Mujibnagar University
| style="text-align:center;"|MU
| style="text-align:center;"|Meherpur
| style="text-align:center;"|Khulna division
| style="text-align:center;"|General
| style="text-align:center;" |
|-
|Jatir Janak Bangabandhu Sheikh Mujibur Rahman Science and Technology University
| style="text-align:center;"|JJBSMRSTU
| style="text-align:center;"|Narayanganj
| style="text-align:center;"|Dhaka division
| style="text-align:center;"|STEM
| style="text-align:center;" |
|-
|Bangabandhu Sheikh Mujibur Rahman Science and Technology University, Pirojpur
| style="text-align:center;"|BSMRSTUP
| style="text-align:center;"|Pirojpur
| style="text-align:center;"|Barishal division
| style="text-align:center;"|STEM
| style="text-align:center;" |
|-
|Marine Science University of Barisal
| style="text-align:center;" |MSUB
| style="text-align:center;" |Barishal
| style="text-align:center;" |Barishal Division
| style="text-align:center;" |Maritime studies
| style="text-align:center;" |
|-
|Michael Madhusudan Cultural University
| style="text-align:center;"|MMCU
| style="text-align:center;"|Jashore 
| style="text-align:center;"|Khulna Division 
| style="text-align:center;"|Cultural studies
| style="text-align:center;"|
|-
|Bangladesh University of Juridical Sciences
| style="text-align:center;"|BUJS
| style="text-align:center;"|
| style="text-align:center;"| 
| style="text-align:center;"|Legal education
| style="text-align:center;" |
|-
|Bangladesh University of Educational Planning and Administration
| style="text-align:center;"|BUEdPA
| style="text-align:center;"|
| style="text-align:center;"| 
| style="text-align:center;"|Educational management
| style="text-align:center;" |

See also 
 University Grants Commission (Bangladesh)
 List of institutes in Bangladesh

Notes

References

External links 
 University Grants Commission of Bangladesh
 Bangladesh Bureau of Educational Information and Statistics
 Ministry of Education
 list of University in Bangladesh

Public engineering universities of Bangladesh
Bangladesh
Public universities of Bangladesh
Private universities and colleges in Bangladesh
Universities
Universities
Private universities in Bangladesh